Quasimitra nubila, common name the particolored mitre,  is a species of sea snail, a marine gastropod mollusk in the family Mitridae, the miters or miter snails.

Description
The size of the shell varies between 34 mm and 81 mm.

Distribution
This species occurs in the Red Sea and in the Indian Ocean off Madagascar and in the Indo-West Pacific

References

 Dautzenberg, Ph. (1929). Contribution à l'étude de la faune de Madagascar: Mollusca marina testacea. Faune des colonies françaises, III(fasc. 4). Société d'Editions géographiques, maritimes et coloniales: Paris. 321-636, plates IV-VII pp
 Vine, P. (1986). Red Sea Invertebrates. Immel Publishing, London. 224 pp

External links
 Gastropods.com: Mitra (Mitra) nubila nubila

nubila
Gastropods described in 1791